Astrothelium quasimamillanum is a species of corticolous (bark-dwelling) lichen in the family Trypetheliaceae. Found in Brazil, it was formally described as a new species in 2019 by lichenologists André Aptroot and Cléverton de Oliveira Mendonça. It has pear-shaped (pyriform) ascomata, measuring 0.6–0.9 mm in diameter, which mostly occur either immersed in the bark, or as barely discernible black structures under the thallus cortex. The ascospores are hyaline, ellipsoid in shape, and muriform (i.e., divided into multiple chambers by 1–2 vertical and 10–12 transverse septa), with dimensions of 30–33 by 9.5–10.5 μm. The specific epithet quasimamillanum alludes to its slight similarities with members of the Pyrenula mamillana species group.

References

quasimamillanum
Lichen species
Lichens described in 2019
Lichens of North Brazil
Taxa named by André Aptroot